Carapace Nunatak is a prominent isolated nunatak, the most westerly near the head of Mackay Glacier in Victoria Land, standing  southwest of Mount Brooke where it is visible for a considerable distance from many directions. It was so named by the New Zealand party of the Commonwealth Trans-Antarctic Expedition (1956–58) because of the carapaces of small crustaceans found in the rocks. A further rock exposure named Brandau Rocks lies 0.5 nautical miles (1 km) west of Carapace Nunatak.

References 

Nunataks of Oates Land